Luke Brown House is a historic home located at Parishville in St. Lawrence County, New York.  It was built in 1823 and is a 2-story, five-by-three-bay, side-gabled Federal-style residence constructed of red Potsdam Sandstone.  Attached is a -story side frame wing built about 1870.

It was listed on the National Register of Historic Places in 2003.

References

Houses on the National Register of Historic Places in New York (state)
Federal architecture in New York (state)
Houses completed in 1823
Houses in St. Lawrence County, New York
Sandstone houses in the United States
National Register of Historic Places in St. Lawrence County, New York
1823 establishments in New York (state)